Rash Rahim Ibrahim (born 10 June 2001) is a Ghanaian footballer who plays for AS Trenčín in the Fortuna Liga as a midfielder.

Club career

AS Trenčín
Ibrahim made his Fortuna Liga debut for AS Trenčín against ViOn Zlaté Moravce on 23 July 2021.

References

External links
 AS Trenčín official club profile 
 Futbalnet profile 
 
 

2001 births
Living people
Footballers from Accra
Ghanaian footballers
Ghanaian expatriate footballers
Association football midfielders
AS Trenčín players
Slovak Super Liga players
Expatriate footballers in Slovakia
Ghanaian expatriate sportspeople in Slovakia